Oscar Marion Fritz (March 3, 1878October 5, 1957) was an American lawyer and jurist from the U.S. state of Wisconsin.  He was the 14th Chief Justice of the Wisconsin Supreme Court, serving a total of 25 years on the high court.  Prior to that, he served 17 years as a Wisconsin circuit court judge in Milwaukee County.

Biography

Born in Milwaukee, Wisconsin, to German American immigrants Theodore Fritz and Dora Fritz (née Glatz).  During his childhood, his father served four years (1887–1891) in the Wisconsin State Senate, representing part of the city of Milwaukee as a member of the socialist Peoples' Party.

Fritz was educated in Milwaukee Public Schools and studied law through the Milwaukee Law School, a student-owned cooperative which provided night school law classes from volunteer instructors.  He went on to attend the University of Wisconsin Law School in Madison, Wisconsin, where he graduated in 1901.

From 1901 through 1912, Fritz practiced law in Milwaukee in partnership with Theodore Kronshage, Francis E. McGovern, Guy D. Goff, Walter D. Corrigan, and Timothy J. Hannan.  In June 1912, Fritz was appointed Wisconsin circuit court judge by his former law partner, Governor Francis McGovern, to fill the vacancy caused by the death of Judge Warren D. Tarrant.  His appointment was confirmed by election the following spring, and he was elected to a full term in 1917.  He was subsequently re-elected in 1923 and 1929.

In May 1929, just after his circuit court re-election, Judge Fritz was appointed to the Wisconsin Supreme Court by Governor Walter J. Kohler.  He was elected to a full term in 1934, and was subsequently re-elected in 1944.  In 1950, with the retirement of Chief Justice Marvin B. Rosenberry, he became the most-senior serving member of the high court, and thus became the 14th chief justice.  In 1953, Justice Fritz announced he would not run for another term in 1954.  Later that year, he announced he would resign effective January 1, 1954, with a full year left before the end of his term.

Judge Fritz was hospitalized in Milwaukee after a stroke and died there on October 5, 1957.

Personal life and family
Oscar Fritz married Ena B. Lorch in 1902.  They had two children together, Marion (Mar) Theodore and Norma Louise.  Ena died in 1945, and, two years later, Judge Fritz married Anna Marie Millmann of Milwaukee, who was then a member of the board of directors of the Marquette University Alumni Association.

He was survived by his second wife and by both children from his first marriage.  He was cremated and interred alongside his first wife at Milwaukee's historic Forest Home Cemetery.

References

External links
 

Lawyers from Milwaukee
University of Wisconsin Law School alumni
Wisconsin state court judges
Chief Justices of the Wisconsin Supreme Court
1878 births
1957 deaths
Milwaukee Law School alumni